HMS Cassandra was a  destroyer of the Royal Navy, ordered in February 1942 from Yarrow Shipbuilders. She was originally to be named HMS Tourmaline but this was changed to Cassandra in November 1942 to fit her revised class name. She was laid down on 30 January 1943 and launched on 29 November 1943.

Wartime service
On 11 December 1944, she was hit by a torpedo from the U-boat  under the command of Oberleutnant zur See Diether Todenhagen. 62 men died in the attack and she was towed, first by the frigate  and then by a Soviet Navy tugboat to Kola Inlet. U-365 was sunk with all hands two days later by a Fairey Swordfish launched from the aircraft carrier .

Post war service

After the war, Cassandras repairs were completed and she was placed in reserve in 1946. She then served in the Mediterranean Sea and Indian Ocean. Cassandra was modernised by Yarrow and Company. This involved her being fitted with an enclosed bridge and Squid anti-submarine mortars. One set of torpedo tubes and 'X' gun turret were removed at this time.

She re-entered service in April 1960 and was allocated for service in the Far East as part of the 8th Destroyer Squadron. In late June 1961, in response to Iraqi threats to annex Kuwait, Cassandra was ordered to reinforce British naval forces in the Persian Gulf as part of Operation Vantage, arriving on 7 July. The British response successfully deterred Iraq from invading Kuwait, and Cassandra was relieved by the frigate  on 29 July, allowing the destroyer to return to the Far East station. Cassandra covered 50,000 miles during a commission in 1962-3 which took her from the Far East and returning to Portsmouth. In February 1963 the ship became part of the 21st Destroyer Squadron in the Mediterranean. In 1964 and 1965 she served in the Mediterranean and the Far East, including service in the Indonesian Confrontation.

The destroyer was placed in reserve until paying off in January 1966. Cassandra arrived at the breaker's yard of Thos. W. Ward at Inverkeithing for scrapping on 28 April 1967.

References

Publications
 
 
 

 

World War II destroyers of the United Kingdom
Cold War destroyers of the United Kingdom
1943 ships
Ships built on the River Clyde
C-class destroyers (1943) of the Royal Navy